Court chapel, or its equivalent in other languages (like Hofkapelle in German), may refer to:

Buildings
Mannheim Palace Church, founded as a court chapel
Opernhaus am Taschenberg (sometimes indicated as "Hofkapelle"), which served as the Catholic Hofkirche (court church) in Dresden from 1708 to 1751
 Tottenham Court Chapel, a.k.a. Whitefield's Tabernacle, Tottenham Court Road, UK
Hofkapelle of Schloss Weimar, in Weimar, Thuringia, Germany
Hofkapelle of the Hofburg Palace, Vienna
Hofkapelle of the Würzburg Residence, in Würzburg, Lower Franconia, Germany

Musical ensembles
Flemish chapel (capilla flamenca), associated with the Spanish imperial court
Hannoversche Hofkapelle, a court orchestra in Hannover, Germany
Saint Petersburg Court Chapel, Russian imperial court chapel
 Hofkapelle Stuttgart, a German orchestra based in Stuttgart

See also
 Royal chapel (disambiguation)
 Staatskapelle (disambiguation)